Bruce Minney (October 2, 1928 — August 5, 2013) was an American artist who worked in a variety of media. He was a commercial illustrator for over 40 years producing paintings for men’s adventure magazines, paperbacks, and storyboards. Later he moved to ceramics and won numerous awards for his efforts. His most recent work included collages and paintings.

Early life and career
As a child, Minney loved to draw and after graduating from Oakland High in 1946, he was accepted by the California School of Arts and Crafts.

After graduation, he married his high school sweetheart, Doris Schulz, and worked as a fireman in nearby Orinda as he tried to launch his art career.

In 1955, he packed his wife, his four-year-old daughter Carole, and all their belongings into a 1950 Plymouth and drove cross country to New York City.  Doris got a job in advertising with Doyle, Dane, Bernbach, while Bruce stayed home with his daughter and created samples.  Eventually, he hooked up with Eddie Balcourt, a well-known artist's representative, and began his career as a professional illustrator.

Minney did many credited and uncredited illustrations for Stag, For Men Only, Male, True Action, Man’s World and many other publications of Magazine Management.

He also did all the interior illustrations for the short-lived Space Science Fiction Magazine.

As the 1960s wore on and U.S. involvement in Vietnam increased and magazines like Penthouse became more explicit, the readership of the men’s adventure magazines dropped and jobs were harder to come by.  One of the last men’s adventure magazine illustration Bruce did was for National Lampoon in November 1970.  This illustration is a brutal, acerbic parody in the men’s adventure style set in Vietnam.

Minney was the featured artist in Illustration magazine #40.

His work was also featured in the Season 5 episode "Going Hollywood" of the History Channel series American Pickers, which aired on August 5, 2013.

Paperbacks
From 1969 to 1986, Minney created over 400 paperback illustrations in oils and acrylic for Grosset & Dunlap, Avon, Fawcett, Harlequin, Ace, Pinnacle, Manor Books, and Pyramid.  Among the titles he illustrated were:  the Lone Ranger series Horatio Hornblower series,  and Windhaven  series.

Ceramics
In the 1990s and into the 2000s, Minney worked in ceramics and exhibited his works at many arts and crafts shows in California and Florida, winning numerous awards.

References

External links

"Oh, Those Pulpy Days of 'Weasels Ripped My Flesh'" from The New York Times
"Charles Copeland" reprinted from Illustration Magazine #33
Bruce Minney Interview

1928 births
2013 deaths
Artists from Oakland, California
California College of the Arts alumni
Place of birth missing
Place of death missing
People from Orinda, California
American magazine illustrators